Church of Santiago may refer to:

Church of Santiago (Jerez de la Frontera)
Church of Santiago (Lorca)
Church of Santiago (Sariego)
Church of Santiago, Toledo
Church of Santiago el Mayor (Guadalajara)
Church of Santiago Apóstol (Villa del Prado)
Church of Santiago de Gobiendes